Orodes I of Elymais was the ruler of Elymais in the late 1st-century. Unlike the previous rulers of the kingdom, he belonged to a cadet branch of the Arsacid dynasty. His reign thus marks the start of a second line of rulers that replaced the original Kamnaskirid line. While the Kamnaskirid rulers only used Greek legends on their coins, the Arsacid rulers of Elymais used both Greek and Aramaic. Orodes I was succeeded by his son Orodes II, known as Kamnaskires-Orodes.

References

Sources 
 
 

1st-century Iranian people
Arsacid dynasty of Elymais
1st-century deaths
Year of birth unknown
Vassal rulers of the Parthian Empire